Meinmahla Kyun Wildlife Sanctuary is a protected area in Myanmar with an extent of  and one of the ASEAN Heritage Parks. It was declared a Ramsar site in 2017.

Biodiversity
Meinmahla Kyun Wildlife Sanctuary harbours about 40 mangrove species, 53 species of medicinal plants and 11 orchid species, 59 fish species, 35 butterfly species, 26 snake species, 12 shrimp species, 10 crab species, and saltwater crocodile (Crocodylus porosus). A fishing cat (Prionailurus viverrinus) was photographed in February 2016 for the first time in the country.

The sanctuary provides habitat for both resident and migratory birds. Among the 102 species sighted during boat surveys in February 2006 were Oriental white ibis (Threskiornis melanocephalus), glossy ibis (Plegadis falcinellus), bar-tailed godwit (Limosa lapponica), hen harrier (Circus cyaneus), clamorous reed warbler (Acrocephalus stentoreus), Oriental white-eye (Zosterops palpebrosus), greater coucal (Centropus sinensis), red-breasted flycatcher (Ficedula parva), whimbrel (Numenius phaeopus) and black-crowned night-heron (Nycticorax nycticorax).
Nordmann's greenshank (Tringa guttifer), rufous woodpecker (Micropternus brachyurus), lesser adjutant (Leptoptilos javanicus), black-headed ibis (Threskiornis melanocephalus), great thick-knee (Esacus recurvirostris), Eurasian curlew (Numenius arquata), Asian dowitcher (Limnodromus semipalmatus), brown-winged kingfisher (Pelargopsis amauroptera), great knot (Calidris tenuirostris), red knot (C. canutus), curlew sandpiper (Calidris ferruginea), spoon-billed sandpiper (C. pygmeus) and red-necked stint (C. ruficollis) were observed in December 2016.

References

Protected areas of Myanmar
Protected areas established in 1993
ASEAN heritage parks
Ramsar sites in Myanmar
Important Bird Areas of Myanmar
1993 establishments in Myanmar